The 1989–90 Dayton Flyers men's basketball team represented the University of Dayton during the 1989–90 NCAA Division I men's basketball season. The Flyers, led by first year head coach Jim O'Brien, played their home games at the University of Dayton Arena and were members of the Midwestern Collegiate Conference. They finished the season 22–10, 10–4 in MCC play. They won the program's first MCC tournament title after defeating regular season champion Xavier in the championship game. Dayton received the MCC's automatic bid to the NCAA tournament where they upset Illinois in the first round. They lost to eventual Final Four participant Arkansas, 86–84, in the second round.

Roster

Schedule and results

|-
!colspan=9 style=| Regular season

|-
!colspan=9 style=| MCC tournament

|-
!colspan=9 style=| NCAA tournament

NBA draft

References

Dayton Flyers men's basketball seasons
Dayton
Dayton
Dayton
Dayton